Teerth is a village in the Belgaum district of Karnataka, India. It is situated next to the Krishna River in Athani taluk.

References

Villages in Belagavi district